The 2003 Formula Nippon Championship was  contested over 10 rounds. 10 different teams and 21 different drivers competed. All teams had to use Lola chassis (Lola B3/51) and Mugen Honda (Mugen MF308) engines.

Teams and drivers

Calendar

 At race 5 a sprint race of 18 laps (104.526 km) set the grid for the main race. The sprint race winner Richard Lyons started from pole in the main race. Takeshi Tsuchiya set pole position for the sprint race.

Championship standings

Drivers' Championship
Scoring system

Teams' Championship

External links
2003 Japanese Championship Formula Nippon

Formula Nippon
Super Formula
Nippon